Labour process theory (LPT) is a Marxist theory of the organization of work under capitalism. Researchers in critical management studies, organization studies, and related disciplines have used LPT to explain antagonistic relationships between employers and employees in capitalist economies, with a particular focus on problems of deskilling, worker autonomy, and managerial control at the point of production.  

In Marxian economics, the "labour process" refers to the process whereby labour is materialized or objectified in use values. Labour is here an interaction between the person who works and the natural world such that elements of the latter are consciously altered in a purposive manner. Hence, the elements of labour process are three-fold: first, the work itself, a purposive productive activity; second the object(s) on which that work is performed; and third, the instruments which facilitate the process of work.

The land (economically speaking this also includes water) in its original state in which it supplies man with necessaries or means of subsistence ready to hand is available without any effort on his part as the universal material for human labour. All those things which labour merely separates from immediate connection with their environment are object of labour spontaneously provided by nature, such as fish caught and separated from their natural element, namely water, fallen timber in virgin forests and ores extracted from their veins. If on the other hand the object of labour has so to speak been filtered through previous labour, we call it raw material; for example, ore already extracted and ready for washing. All raw material is an object of labour, but not every object of labour is raw material; the object of labour counts as raw material only when it has already undergone some alteration by means of labour. According to Marx: 

The labour process is purposeful activity aimed at the production of use values. The labour process is sometimes loosely termed "work organisation". That which is produced can either be useful in supporting human existence and so have a use value or it can be traded and attain an exchange value. The latter value presupposes the former. As a consequence of humans wanting to improve their material condition, a surplus is generated in the labour processes; that is, an enhancement of the value between inputs and outputs. Labour processes exist in all societies, capitalist or socialist, and it is argued that the organisation and control of a labour process is indicative of the type of society within which it exists.

The labour process theory critiques scientific management as authored by Frederick Winslow Taylor in the early 1900s and uses central concepts developed by Harry Braverman in the 1970s. Recent attempts have been made to use labor process theory to explain workers' bargaining power under contemporary global capitalism. The labour process theory has developed into a broader set of interventions and texts linked to critiquing new forms of management strategy of an exploitative nature. In Labor and Monopoly Capital: Degradation of Work in the Twentieth Century, Braverman seeks to  retrieve and update Marx's critiques of the capitalist labour process through an attack upon bourgeois accounts of work in the industrial society. Although Braverman's primary focus is the degradation of work in the twentieth century, which he associates with the relentless tightening of management control, Labor and Monopoly Capital also contains at least two other loosely related elements: an outline of developments in the wider organization of monopoly capitalist societies, and an examination of changes in their occupational and class structures.

The labour process theory looks at how people work, who controls their work, what skills they use in work and how they are paid for work. Braverman posits a very broad thesis, namely that under capitalism management steals workers skills, reduces the pleasurable nature of work and the power workers have through controlling skill while cutting their wages by reducing their wages to those of unskilled workers and increasing the amount of exertion required from workers. Braverman primarily pays attention to the class-in-itself or the working class as the subject of management and capitalist brutality, acknowledging his inability to attend to working class self-emancipation in this context. Following in Braverman's footsteps, others have criticised his deskilling thesis as not universal and have attended to working class resistance to the imposition of Fordism. A key element of the labour process theory is an analysis of the local systems of management and control and an examination of how these are used to reduce the power of sections of the working class who hold work skills that are not reproducible by unskilled labour or machine power.

References 

Marxian economics